Gnathang Monastery is a Buddhist monastery in Sikkim in northeastern India.  The monastery is about 100 years old.

References

Buddhist monasteries in Sikkim
Tibetan Buddhist monasteries and temples in India